The Keris-class are a class of large patrol vessels (Littoral Mission Ship) of the Royal Malaysian Navy (RMN) with a length of  and displacing 700 tons. A total of 18 ships are planned. As of 2018, four ships have been funded by the Malaysian government.

Development
The ships will be built by Malaysia and China companies under the joint development agreement. Malaysia and China agreed to jointly develop a Littoral Mission Ship and, two ships will be built in China by China Shipbuilding and Offshore International Co. Ltd, the rest will be built in Malaysia by local company Boustead Heavy Industries Corporation (BHIC). The first ship was to be delivered to the Royal Malaysian Navy by 2019, the second and third by 2020 and the fourth by 2021.

Description 

The ships are enlarged and improved version of
Durjoy-class large patrol craft of the Bangladesh Navy but armed with only guns as per requirement of the Royal Malaysian Navy. The ships able to carry up three standard ISO containers. The ships will support missions including anti-surface warfare, mine warfare, hydrography and intelligence, surveillance and reconnaissance (ISR) duties.

Improved design

Revolutionary Littoral Mission Ship 
BHIC revealed a newer design of the Littoral Mission Ship in Defence Service Asia 2018 named Revolutionary Littoral Mission Ship. It will have low radar cross section where BHIC has already improved their stealth design and the addition of a flight deck to accommodate a medium-sized helicopter. This new design will be offered by BHIC to the Royal Malaysian Navy for the next batch after all the four ships of the initial design were jointly constructed by Malaysia and China companies. A total of 18 ships of this class are planned to be ordered by the Royal Malaysian Navy.

Program revised

After the government changed in 2018 Malaysian general election, the Littoral Mission Ship acquisition program was revised in early 2019 to reduce the procurement costs and shorten the delivery process. Through this new contract all four ships will be built by China from the original contract, which was initially be two vessels built by China and the rest built by Malaysia. In September 2020, Malaysia planned that the next batch of the ship will be the new design from other company. Its includes a 68 m offshore patrol vessel concept from Netherland shipbuilder Damen known as the Damen Stan Patrol Vessel 6811, a 70.7 m offshore patrol vessel from US shipbuilder Swiftships, a 70.2 m offshore patrol vessel from German shipbuilder Fassmer and a 70 m offshore patrol vessel from local company Preston. While the joint venture between Malaysian company, Destini, and Netherlands-based shipbuilder, Damen, offered the proposal that similar to the ship that ordered by Malaysia Coast Guard which is a 83 m Damen 1800 OPV.

Ships

See also 

  (Singapore)
 Krabi-class patrol vessel (Thailand)

References 

Patrol vessels of the Royal Malaysian Navy
Patrol boat classes